The Mishar Tatars (endonyms: мишәрләр, мишәр татарлары, mişärlär, mişär tatarları), previously known as the Meshcheryaki (мещеряки), are the second largest subgroup of the Volga Tatars, right after Kazan Tatars. Traditionally, they have inhabited the middle and western side of Volga, including the nowadays Mordovia, Tatarstan, Bashkortostan, Ryazan, Penza, Ulyanovsk, Orenburg, Nizhny Novgorod and Samara regions of Russia. Many have since relocated to Moscow. Mishars also comprise majority of the Finnish Tatars and Tatars living in other Nordic and Baltic countries.

The Mishar Tatars are said to be one of the clearest descendants of ancient Turkic Kipchak culture. Mishars speak the western dialect of Tatar language and like the Tatar majority, practice Sunni Islam. They have at least partially different ethnogenesis from the Kazan Tatars, though many differences have since disappeared. In the 1897 census, their total number was 622 600. The estimates have varied greatly, mainly because they are often identified simply as Tatars.

Etymology 
Linguist J. J. Mikkola thought the name might come from a reconstructed Mordvinic word ḿeškär, meaning "beekeeper", and thus can be connected to the Finnic tribe Meshchera. A. M. Orlov has also connected the Mishar Tatars to Meshchera, but he thinks it was a Turkic tribe rather. Orlov, Tatishev and Karamzin in addition connect it to the Don Cossacks, who allegedly were largely formed by "Meshchera Tatars". The name was also the center of the Mishar populated Kasim Khanate, Gorodets Meshchyorsky. (Tatar: Mişär yortı). It might eventually come from the name of a Eastern-Hungarian tribe, the Madjars.

"Mişär" most likely comes from the Kazan Tatars. Previously, in Russian sources, they were known as the Meshcheryaki (мещеряки). 

Other former confessional names among Mishar groups are the regional tömän (Tyumen), alatır (Alatyr), and general term möselman (Muslim). Some also called themselves "Nogay" (or Nugay), referring to Nogais that populated the Kasim Khanate, and possibly mixed with them. In some sources, Mishars are known as "Kasimov Tatars", which was a "transitional group between Kazan Tatars and Mishar Tatars".

The Mishars themselves mostly identify as Tatar, which they adopted from the Russians before other Tatar groups usually in late 1800s. However, still in 1926 cencus, 200 000 called themselves "Mishars". The Tatar name originates from the time of Golden Horde, when the feudal nobility used it for its population. Later, also Russian feudals and the Tsar government started using the name, though many of them still called themselves möselman or mişär instead.

In 2006, based on a single interview done in an ethnically diverse Chuvash village, the Mishars saw Islam central to their identity; they stated that Kryashens, the Christian Tatars, were not Tatars at all. They themselves identified as "Tatar", and the term Mishar only came up after repeated questioning.

History 

Mishars are the second main subgroup of Volga Tatars, other one being the Kazan Tatars. They differ mainly on living locations and dialect, though the Mishars also have at least partially different ethnogenesis from the Kazan Tatars.

Regional formation 
The formation of the group took place in the forest-steppe zone on the west side of the Sura river, along the tributaries of the Oka. Individual nomadic groups began to move to this area inhabited by the Finnic peoples at the beginning of the 11th century. During the Golden Horde, Kipchaks moved to the region and founded e.g. Temnikov, Narovchat, Shatsky and Kadom fortresses. After the Golden Horde weakened, they became subjects of Russia, who farmed the land and paid the yasak tax or performed military service.

The ethnic character of the Mishars was mostly finally formed during 1400–1500 in Qasim Khanate. After migration waves from late 1500s to 1700s, they settled especially on the right bank of Volga and Urals. Increased contacts with Kazan Tatars made these two groups even closer, and thus, "Tatar nation" was born; eventually replacing previously used regional names.

Historian Alimzhan Orlov thinks the Mishars of Nizhny Novgorod Oblast are "real Mishars". G. Ahmarov says that Mishars arrived in Novgorod in early 1600s, though some of them might have already been on the territory before; Tatars who called themselves the Meshcheryaks had settled to the deserts in the eastern part of the region already before the Invasion of Kazan (1552). In remaining texts, they recall “with great longing the happy life of their ancestors in the Kazan Khanate".

Ancestors 

The origin of the Mishar Tatars has remained a point of controversy for years.

R. G. Muhamedova thought that the main components for their ethnogenesis are Bolgars, Kipchaks, Burtas, and Madjar. Her assumption was, that during the collapse of the Golden Horde, the Bolgars who lived on the Sura River ended up in the area where the city of Naruchad was later founded. Here, they partially assimilated to the local population and mixed with other Turkic tribes, especially the Kipchaks.

Researchers such as Velyaminov-Zernov, Radlov and Mozharovski all thought that Mishars were originally a "Tatarized" part of the Finnic Meshchera. M. Zekiyev, G. Ahmarov ja A. Orlov all questioned the idea of the Meshchera-theory as such.

Zekiyev states: "If this theory proves to be true, there must be clear traces of Mordvinic or other Finno-Ugric elements among the Tatars, but there are none". Ahmarov also didn't think it was possible that Meshchera could have adopted Tatar language. Conversely, he suggested that their ancestors could be "Asian nomads, that flooded Europe and settled in Akhtuba under Golden Horde, and after this, with the lead of Qasim Khan, in the territory of Oka river where they became known by the city name, Gorodets Meshchyorsky. (Tatar: Mişär yortı).

The theory of A. Orlov is as follows then: The ancestors of Mishar Tatars are formed by Cumans and Meshchera. However, Orlov denies the Finnic background of the tribe. He thinks Meshchera was all along a Turkic tribe (Polovtsian), that by Ivan the Terrible, were named as Mari/Tsheremis. Orlov states, that Mishars originate from "ancient Meshchera", which is first mentioned in Golden Horde. He also proposes, that these Turkic Meshchera largely formed the Don Cossacks, also allegedly known as the "Meschera Cossacks", even before the time of Kasim Khanate. These Cossacks then would have ended up in the Khanate, transferred by Vasily I of Moscow. Based on Orlov's text, he is not alone with the theory. A. Gordeyev connects the formation of Cossacks to Golden Horde and Tatishev made a connection between "Meshchera Tatars" and Don Cossacks. Karamzin, according to him, wrote the following: "Cossacks are just Meschera Tatars". Orlov also states however, that not all ancestors of Nizhny Novorod Mishars are from Meshchera, rather, some can be traced back to Volga Bulgaria, and others to Siberia.

Theory about the Golden Horde unifies researchers. A. Halikov, F. Gimranov and H. Aydullin thought, that in addition to Kasimov, Mishars originate at least partially from Mukhsa Ulus. UCLA Center for Near East Studies states that Mishars most likely descent from the Kipchaks of Golden Horde, that settled on the West side of the Volga.

The Hungarian theory exists also. Friar Julian describes Eastern Hungarians he found in Bashkiria in 1235. They spoke to him Hungarian and their language remained mutually intelligible. Some scientists of the 19th and 20th centuries, based on equivalency of the Turkic ethnonym Madjar (variants: Majgar, Mojar, Mishar, Mochar) with the Hungarian self-name Magyar, associated them with Hungarian speaking Magyars and came to a conclusion that Turkic-speaking Mishars were formed by a Turkization of those Hungarians who remained in the region after their main part left to the West in the 8th century.. The shift magyar>mozhar is natural for Hungarian phonology and this form of the ethnonym was in use until they shifted to Tatar in 15-16th centuries. The existence of the ethnic toponyms mozhar, madjar to the east of Carpathian region proves this. The presence of early medieval Hungarian culture is attested by archeological findings in Volga-Ural region. The influence of Hungarian language resulted in forming definite conjugation in Mordvinic languages which is found only in Ugric languages. Medieval Hungarian loans are found in Volga Bulgarian and Mordvinic languages.

Orlov thought that the ancestors of Mishars merged with the Madjars in Meshchera.

The ethnogenesis of Kazan Tatars and Mishars is said to differ at least to some degree. G. Tagirdzhanov proposed, that they both originally came from the population of Volga Bulgaria, and Mishars from its Esegel tribe.

Culture 

Like the Tatar majority, Mishars also are Sunni Muslim.

The Mishars speak the western dialect of the Tatar language. (The Mishar Dialect). It is further divided into several local dialects. The Western dialect is characterized by the absence of the labialized [ɒ] and the uvular [q] and [ʁ] found in the Middle Tatar dialect. In some local dialects there is an affricate [tʃ], in others [ts]. The written Tatar language (ie the Kazan dialect) has been formed as a result of the mixing of central and western dialects. The Mishar dialect, especially in the Sergach area, has been said to be very similar to the ancient Kipchak languages. Some linguists (Radlov, Samoylovich) think that Mishar Tatar belongs to the Kipchak-Cuman group rather than to the Kipchak-Bulgar group.

Material from the second half of the 18th century on the Mishar dialect shows references to the Kasimov dialect, which has since disappeared, and especially to the Kadom area. Russian loanwords also appear. When studying Nizhny Novgorod Tatars, it was found that they use "Arabic letters learned from the Kazan Tatars, but know them very poorly, and therefore also write in Cyrillic".

G. N. Ahmarov noticed a similarity in the Mishar and Kazakh cultures in the national dress of women and in the ancient Kipchak words, which are not found in the Kazan Tatar dialect, but are in the center for the Kazakhs, as well as Siberian Tatars and Altai people.

Russian and Mordvian influences have been observed in Mishar architecture, house construction and home decoration. Mishar tales often contain signs of paganism and a lot of animal motifs. Social satire has also been popular. It usually targetes the rich and spiritual leaders. Folk poetry is wistful, about the home region and miserable human fates. The wedding songs of the Mishar people are very similar to the songs of the Chuvash. According to Orlov, the Mishars resemble the Karaites and the Balkars because of their language, traditional food, and the naming of the days of the week. A. Samoylovich writes; "The individual name system of the days of the week is observed in a wide area, from the Meshcheryaks of the Sergach region of Nizhny Novgorod province to the Turks of Anatolia and the Balkan Peninsula."

Even though the Mishars have many different ethnic traits, they are (like Balkars) said to be one of the "purest representatives" of ancient Kipchaks today. Orlov states: "Nizhny Novogord Tatars are one of the original Tatar groups, who maintain the continuity of Kipchak-Turkic language, culture and tradition."

A. Leitzinger thinks Mishars have more Kipchak in their dialect, where as Bolgar influence possibly is found better among the Kazan Tatars.

Mishars and Russians 

Accordin to Leitzinger, Mishars are traditionally maybe slightly more "symphatetic" to Russians than Kazan Tatars. These two groups have lived next to each other and therefore the Mishars have been influenced by them. Due to this, the Kazan Tatars have thought, maybe condescendingly, that Mishars are "half Russian". It is important to note, however, that Mishars are not among the so called "Russified Tatars", but still maintain their Kipchak-Turkic language and Sunni Islam faith.

Mishars are known to have partaken in the Cossack army of Stenka Razin during the 1670–1671 uprising, and probably also in other revolutions in Russian Empire. In 1798-1865, they formed the "Bashkir-Meshcheryaki Army" (Башкиро-мещерякское войско), which was an irregural formation, but took part for example in the French Invasion of Russia. (1812).

Orlov says that "Meshchera Tatars" were in the Cossack army of Russian conquest of Siberia. Orlov has also gave a simple statement relating to this; "The ancestors of Mishars are the Don Cossacks".

In some sources, Mishars are known as "Kasimov Tatars", since they were formed there. However, the formation, also known as Qasıym Tatars, was eventually a separate Tatar group; according to S. Ishkhakov, an "ethnically transitional group between Kazan Tatars and Mishar Tatars." Kasimov Tatars took part in the Conquest of Kazan and in wars against Sweden with Ivan the Terrible.

In 1400-1500s, the Tatars of Kasim Khanate operated as representatives and translators in Russian court.

Population 
Since World War II, estimates of the number of Mishars have varied; 300,000 - 2,000,000. The census has been complicated by them sometimes being counted as their own group (Mishar/Mescheryaki) and sometimes as Tatars in general. Merging with the people of Kazan has also contributed to the matter. In 1926 cencus, there were 200 000 Mishars, but the number was thought to be higher in reality, because not everyone identified as Mishar. In 1897, the number of "Mishars" had been 622 600.

Traditionally, the Mishars have inhabited the western side of the Volga River. Majority of the Nizhny Novgorod Mishars currently live in Moscow.

DNA Studies 
Recent population genetic analysis shows that medieval Hungarian Conqueror elite is positioned among Turkic groups, Bashkirs and Volga Tatars, which, according to the study, is "in agreement with contemporary historical accounts which denominated the Conquerors as Turks".

Notable Mishar Tatars 

 Xäydär Bigiçev (1949-1998) - singer
 Lotfulla Fättaxov (1918-1981) - painter
 Rifat Fättaxov (b. 1966) - journalist, cultural worker
 Şamil Sasykov (b. 1948) - wood carver
 Räşit Wahapov (1908–1962) - singer
 Sadıyq Äbelxanov (1915-1943) - gunner, sergeant

See also 
Eastern Hungarians
Friar Julian

Literature 

 Leitzinger, Antero: Mishäärit – Suomen vanha islamilainen yhteisö. (Sisältää Hasan Hamidullan ”Yañaparin historian”. Suomentanut ja kommentoinut Fazile Nasretdin). Helsinki: Kirja-Leitzinger, 1996. ISBN 952-9752-08-3.
 Орлов, Алимжан Мустафинович: Нижегородские татары: этнические корни и исторические судьбы. Н. Новгород : Изд-во Нижегор. ун-та, 2001. ISBN 5-8746-407-8 (Archived online version)

References 

Ethnic groups in Russia
Volga Tatars
Finnish Tatars